Italian grammar is the body of rules describing the properties of the  Italian language. Italian words can be divided into the following lexical categories: articles, nouns, adjectives, pronouns, verbs, adverbs, prepositions, conjunctions, and interjections.

Articles
Italian articles vary according to definiteness (definite, indefinite, and partitive), number, gender, and the initial sound of the subsequent word. Partitive articles compound the preposition di with the corresponding definite article, to express uncertain quantity. In the plural, they typically translate into English as "few"; in the singular, typically as "some".

{| class="wikitable" border="1"
|+Partitive article
!Gender
!Number
!Article
!Contraction of
|-
|rowspan=5|Masculine
|rowspan=3|Singular
|del
|di + il
|-
|dell'
|di + l|-
|dello
|di + lo
|-
|rowspan=2|Plural
|dei
|di + i
|-
|degli
|di + gli
|-
|rowspan=3|Feminine
|rowspan=2|Singular
|della
|di + la
|-
|dell'
|di + l|-
|Plural
|delle
|di + le
|}

Inflection of nouns and adjectives

Nouns have gender (masculine, feminine or many times, both.) and inflect in number (singular and plural). When a noun refers to people or animals with natural gender, grammatical gender typically corresponds. The gender each noun is written in is the opposite of arbitrary. Because most nouns have a masculine and a feminine form, the form the given noun is written in could change the entire structure of the sentence. As in most other Romance languages, the historical neuter has merged with the masculine. A subgroup of these deriving from Latin's second declension are considered feminine in the plural. Subclauses and infinitives are masculine. Adjectives inflect for gender and number in patterns broadly similar to nouns.

In the last two examples, only the article carries information about gender and number.

Most masculine words that end in -io pronounced as  drop the -o and thus end in -i in the plural: vecchio / vecchi ("old"), funzionario / funzionari ("functionary(-ies)"), esempio / esempi ("example(s)"), etc.

The Italian hard and soft C and G phenomenon leads to certain peculiarities in spelling and pronunciation:
 Words in -cio and -gio form plurals in -ci and -gi, e.g. bacio / baci ("kiss(es)")
 Words in -cia and -gia have been a point of contention. According to a commonly employed rule, they:
 form plurals in -ce and -ge if the final letter before the suffix is a consonant: frangia, frange ("fringe(s)"); faccia, facce ("face(s)").
 form plurals in -cie and -gie if the final letter before the suffix is a vowel: camicia, camicie ("shirt(s)"); ciliegia, ciliegie ("cherry"/"cherries"). Note that the presence of an i in the plural ending has no impact on the pronunciation in this case.
 when the i is stressed, it always remains in plural: farmacia / farmacie ("chemist's shop(s)"), nevralgia / nevralgie ("neuralgia(s)").
 Words in -co and -go behave irregularly: for some words the plural form causes the hard consonant to become soft, and for others the consonant remains hard. "The grammarians are skeptical of any attempt at giving a ruling about this area". There are, however, certain rules of thumb:
 plurals are formed with -chi and -ghi if the last letter before the suffix is a consonant or a stressed vowel: fungo / funghi ("mushroom(s)"), stecco / stecchi ("stick(s)"), mago / maghi ("magician(s)"), fuoco / fuochi ("fire(s)")
 plurals are formed with -ci and -gi if the last letter before the suffix is an unstressed vowel: comico / comici ("comedian(s)"), medico / medici ("physician(s)")
 in words ending with -logo suffix, the plural is usually in -gi when -logo means  "expert" or "student", corresponding to English -logist (e.g. archeologo / archeologi, "archaeologist(s)"), while it is in -ghi when it means "speech" or "reasoning", corresponding often to English -logue/-log (e.g. catalogo / cataloghi, "catalogue(s)").
 there are exceptions such as amico / amici ("friend(s)"), greco / greci ("Greek(s)"), valico / valichi ("mountain pass(es)"), carico / carichi ("cargo(s)").
 Words in -ca and -ga form plurals in -che and -ghe, e.g. amica / amiche ("female friend(s)")

Nouns
Most nouns are derived from Latin. Many of these are themselves borrowed from Greek (e.g. poeta below). Although Italian nouns do not inflect for case, they are derived from a mixture of the Latin nominative and accusative cases:

Nouns ending in any letter other than -a, -e or -o, as well as nouns ending in a stressed vowel, are normally invariable in the plural. Thus:
 la gru / le gru ("the crane(s)", from Latin grūs / grūes)
 la città / le città ("the city(ies)", contracted form of archaic cittade, cittadi, from Latin cīvitātem, cīvitātēs)
 il caffè / i caffè ("the coffee(s)")
 il film / i film ("the film(s)")

There are certain words (derived from Latin second-declension neuter nouns) that are masculine in the singular and feminine or masculine in the plural. Examples include:
 il braccio / le braccia or i bracci ("the arm(s)")
 l'uovo / le uova ("the egg(s)")
 il ginocchio / le ginocchia or i ginocchi ("the knee(s)")
 il sopracciglio / le sopracciglia or i sopraccigli ("the eyebrow(s)")
These nouns' endings derive regularly from the Latin neuter endings of the second declension (sg. -um / pl. -a), but there are some from the third declension as well: e.g. il gregge / le greggi (flock(s), but i greggi works, too); the tradition of calling them "irregular" or "mobile gender" (genere mobile) would come from the paradigm that there are so few nouns of this kind that the existence of neuter can be considered vestigial. The choice of plural is sometimes left to the user, while in some cases there are differences of meaning:
 Sometimes, for body parts, the feminine/neuter plural denotes the literal meaning while the masculine one denotes a figurative meaning: il braccio ("the arm") / le braccia ("the arms") / i bracci ("the isthmuses", "the inlets"); il corno ("the horn") / le corna ("the horns" of an animal) / i corni ("the horns" as musical instruments)
 Sometimes, especially in poetic and old-fashioned Italian, the masculine plural acts as a count noun, while the neuter/feminine plural acts as a mass noun: il cervello ("the brain") / due cervelli ("two brains") / le cervella ("the cerebral matter"); l'anello ("the ring") / due anelli ("two rings") / le anella ("ringlets"); furthermore, il dito ("the finger") / le dita ("the fingers") and also due dita ("two fingers") / but i diti indici ("the index fingers")

Most noun stems are derived from the accusative: Latin socer/socerum begets Italian suocero, and Latin pēs/pēdem begets Italian piede. There are a few exceptions, however, such as uomo from Latin homo/hominem and moglie from Latin mulier/mulierem. Neuter third-declension nouns may bequeath Italian nouns either from the nominative/accusative case (e.g. capo from caput, cuore from cor) or from the oblique case used for other cases and for the plural (e.g. latte from lac, lact-, giure from ius, iur-).

Irregular plurals
There are a few genuine irregular plurals in Italian (plurali irregolari). Most of these were introduced in Vulgar Latin, but some derive from irregular Latin plurals. Examples include:
 (man/men; Latin )
 (god(s); note also the irregularity in the article: gli instead of i)
 (ox(en); Latin )

Alteration
In Italian, altered nouns are nouns with particular shades of meaning. They are divided into diminutives, "vezzeggiativi" (diminutives with kindness and sympathy nuance), augmentatives and pejoratives.

Many other alterations can be built, sometimes with more than one suffix: for example, libro (book) can become libretto (diminutive), libricino (double diminutive), libercolo (diminutive + pejorative), libraccio (pejorative), libraccione (pejorative + augmentative).
Uomo (man), coming from Latin homo, becomes om- in altered forms: omino/ometto (diminutive), omone (augmentative), omaccio (pejorative), omaccione (augmentative + pejorative).

Adjectives
In Italian, an adjective can be placed before or after the noun. The unmarked placement for most adjectives (e.g. colours, nationalities) is after the noun, but this is reversed for a few common classes of adjective — those denoting beauty, age, goodness, and size are placed before the noun in the unmarked case, and after the noun for emphasis.

Placing the adjective after the noun can alter its meaning or indicate restrictiveness of reference. If a noun has many adjectives, usually no more than one will be before the noun.

un libro rosso = a red book (the unmarked case)
un rosso libro = a book that is red (the marked case; it is especially important to the intended meaning that the book is red, as opposed to some other color)
un buon uomo = a good man (the unmarked case)
un uomo buono = a man who is good (the marked case; it is especially important to the intended meaning that he is good, the adjective is emphasized)

Adjectives are inflected for gender and number:

Degrees of comparison
Italian has three degrees of comparison: comparative, relative superlative and absolute superlative.

The comparative and relative superlative are formed with più ("more", "most"); for instance:
 sono più alto di te ("I am taller than you")
 sono il più alto fra gli uomini ("I am the tallest of men")

Vice versa, inverting the order of the words, it's required to replace più with meno ("less, fewer"); for instance:
 sono il meno forte del campionato ("I am the least strong of the championship")
 tu sei meno alto di me  ("You are less tall than me")

Another comparative form is made with the word come ('as', 'like'); for instance:
 sono alto come te ("I am as tall as you")

The absolute comparative is formed by placing troppo ("too") before the adjective; for instance: 
 sei troppo buono ("you are too good").

The absolute superlative, derived from the Latin synthetic superlative in -issimus, is formed by adding -issimo to an adjective: intelligente ("intelligent"), intelligentissimo ("very intelligent"); sporco ("dirty") sporchissimo ("very dirty"). If the two letters before the last vowel are pr or br (e.g., aspro, celebre), the r is removed and -errimo is the suffix used (asperrimo, celeberrimo) ("very sour", "very famous").
Another way to form the absolute superlative is to place either molto or assai ("very") before the adjective. For instance sporchissimo and molto sporco ("very dirty") are the same, although the form ending in issimo is usually perceived as more emphatic; that is, sporchissimo is dirtier than molto sporco.

Some adjectives have irregular comparatives (though with regularly-formed variants also in common use), like
 buono ("good"), migliore / più buono ("better" or "best"), migliore / ottimo / buonissimo ("very good")
 cattivo ("bad"), peggiore / più cattivo ("worse" or "worst"), pessimo / cattivissimo ("very bad")
 grande ("big"), maggiore / più grande ("bigger"), massimo / grandissimo ("very big")
 piccolo ("small"), minore / più piccolo ("smaller"), minimo / piccolissimo ("very small")

Possessive adjectives
With the exception of 3rd person plural loro 'their', possessive adjectives, like articles, must agree with the gender and number of the noun they modify. Hence, mio zio (my uncle), but mia zia (my aunt). So depending on what is being modified, the possessive adjectives are:

In most cases the possessive adjective is used with an article, usually the definite article:

And sometimes with the indefinite article:

The only exception is when the possessive refers to an individual family member (unless the family member is described or characterized in some way):

Mamma and papà (or babbo, in Central Italy; "mother" and "father"), however, are usually used with the article.

For emphasis, however, possessive adjectives are sometimes placed after the noun. This is usually after words like 'colpa' (fault, sin); 'casa' (house, home); 'merito' (merit); 'piacere' (pleasure); or in vocative expressions.

If the antecedent of a third person possessive (being used as an object) is the subject of the sentence, proprio can be used instead of suo,<ref>{{Cite web |url=http://www.accademiadellacrusca.it/faq/faq_risp.php?id=7689&ctg_id=45 |title=Accademia della Crusca, Impiego di Proprio e Suo' |access-date=2009-06-25 |archive-url=https://web.archive.org/web/20110720031553/http://www.accademiadellacrusca.it/faq/faq_risp.php?id=7689&ctg_id=45 |archive-date=2011-07-20 |url-status=dead }}</ref> though the usage of proprio is declining in spoken language:

The first sentence is unambiguous and states that Marco took his own point of view, whereas the second sentence is ambiguous because it may mean that Marco took either his own or Maria's point of view.

Demonstrative adjectives
Italian originally had three degrees of demonstrative adjectives: questo (for items near or related to the first person speaker: English "this"), quello (for items near or related to an eventual third person: English "that"), and codesto (for items near or related to an eventual second person). The usage has undergone a simplification, including the meaning of codesto in quello, and only Tuscan speakers still use codesto. Its use is very rare in modern language, and the word has acquired a rather pejorative connotation.

Pronouns

Italian features a sizeable set of pronouns. Personal pronouns are inflected for person, number, case, and, in the third person, gender. Literary subject pronouns also have a distinction between animate (egli, ella) and inanimate (esso, essa) antecedents, although this is lost in colloquial usage, where lui, lei and loro are the most used forms for animate subjects, while no specific pronoun is employed for inanimate subjects (if needed, demonstrative pronouns such as "questo" or "quello" may be used).  There is also the uninflected pronoun ciò, which is only used with abstract antecedents.

Personal pronouns are normally omitted in the subject, as the conjugation is usually enough to determine the grammatical person. They are used when some emphasis is needed, e.g. sono italiano ("I am Italian") vs. io sono italiano ("I [specifically, as opposed to others] am Italian").

The words ci, vi and ne act both as personal pronouns (respectively instrumental and genitive case) and clitic pro-forms for "there" (ci and vi, with identical meaning – as in c'è, ci sono, v'è, vi sono, ci vengo, etc.) and "from there" (ne – as in è entrato in casa alle 10:00 e ne è uscito alle 11:00).

Notes:

Clitic pronouns

Though objects come after the verb as a rule, this is often not the case with a class of unstressed clitic pro-forms.

Clitic pronouns are replaced with the stressed form for emphatic reasons. A somewhat similar situation is represented by the dative shift in English ditransitive verbs. Compare, for example, (emphasis in italic) "John gave a book to her" with "John gave her a book". In Italian these two different emphases map respectively to "John diede un libro a lei" (stressed form) and "John le diede un libro" (clitic form). Compared to English, Italian presents a richer set of cases.

Clitic pronouns generally come before the verb, but in certain types of constructions, such as lo devo fare, they can also appear as enclitics (attached to the verb itself) – in this case, devo farlo. In the infinitive, gerund and, except with third-person courtesy forms, imperative moods clitic pronouns must always be compound to the suffix as enclitics (as in confessalo! [2p. sg.]/confessiamolo! [1p. pl.]/confessatelo! [2p. pl.], ricordandolo and mangiarlo).

Other examples:

(Compare with the similar use of objective pronouns and pro-forms in French and Catalan.)

Finally, in the imperative mood, the objective pronouns come once again after the verb, but this time as a suffix:

 Stressed forms of all four non-subject cases are used when emphasized (e.g. "uccidi me, non lui" ("kill me, not him"), dallo a lei ("give it to her"), lo farò con lui ("I'll do it with that"), etc.).
 In colloquial speech, form I. of the dative (mi, ti, gli, le, si, ci, vi) is often associated with the emphasized form of the dative (a me, a te, a lui, a lei, a sé, a noi, a voi, a loro) in such a way: a me mi danno un libro ("they give me a book"), a loro gli hanno venduto una casa ("they sold them a house"). Though widely used, this redundant usage is considered non-standard.

 Combinations of clitics 

In Italian it is possible to append more than one clitic to a single verb. In normal usage, two is the usual limit, although clusters of three can occasionally arise for some speakers, especially with impersonal constructs (e.g. Ce la si sente = "One feels up to it", or Nessuno ha ancora visto l'ultimo film di Woody Allen, quindi ce lo si vede tutti insieme! = "Nobody has watched the last Woody Allen movie yet, so we have to watch it together!"). Any two cases can be used together, except for accusative + genitive, and word order is strictly determined according to one of the following two patterns:

When third-person non-reflexive accusative or genitive clitics are used, form II. of the other clitic is used, which always precedes it. Thus:

For example:
Ve lo dico già da ora: io non verrò! = "I already told you [pl.] (said it to you): I'm not coming!" (dative + accusative)
Ce li ha già dati = "He/she/you already gave them to us" (dative + accusative)
Ecco l'uomo di cui mi innamorai! Te ne ho portato la foto! = "Here's the man I fell in love with! I brought you the picture (of him)!" (dative + genitive)
Vedresti Carla con una gonna lunga e un cappello? – Sì, ce la vedrei = "Could you imagine Carla with a long skirt and a hat? – Yes, I could imagine her with that" (instrumental + accusative)
Riuscirai a trasportare abbastanza mele con quel piccolo furgoncino? – Uomo di poca fede! Ce ne trasporterò quintali! = "Will you be able to transport enough apples with such a small van? – Man of little faith! I'll transport quintals of them (with it)!" (instrumental + genitive)

Otherwise, form I. is used for both clitics:

Thus:
Mi ti mostro senza veli = "I'm showing myself without veils to you" (accusative + dative)
Ti si fece incontro = "He/she approached you (moved himself/herself to you)" (dative + accusative)
"[G]li ti darò nelle mani, perché in pezzi ti faccia come tu meriti" = "I will deliver you to him, so that he will tear you to pieces as you deserve" (dative + accusative)
Marco ha vinto! Che farà con tutti quei soldi? – Ci si pagherà l'Università = "Marco won! What's he going to do with all that money? – He'll use it to pay for college (pay for college for himself with it)" (instrumental + dative)
Metti via quella pistola! Ti ci ammazzi! = "Put away that pistol! You'll use it to kill yourself (kill yourself with it)!" (accusative + instrumental)

Apocopated forms

Clitic forms (except "cui") before  a verbal form beginning with a  vowel (except when they are compound to the suffix) can be apocopated; apocopations are more common before verbal forms "è", "ho", "hai", "ha", "hanno", "abbia", and "abbiano" of verbs "essere" and "avere", than when they are before verbal forms of other verbs, which are more rare, also apocopations of "che" are rare, while apocopation of "cui" is avoided due to phonetic ambiguities with words such as "qua" (homophone to "cu'ha").
Apocopation is not mandatory.Ci is graphically apocopated only in front of "e" and "i" (as in c'è and c'inserisco), but the "i" is graphically kept in front of other vowels (as in mi ci addentro), although in all cases it is pronounced /t͡ʃ/ (without the "i"); similarly gli is graphically apocopated only in front of "i" (as in gl'impongo) but not in front of other vowels (gli è dato sapere), although in all cases the "i" is never pronounced. The apocopated form of che is always pronounced /k/, even when otherwise common phonetic rules switch their pronunciations.

T–V distinction

Italian makes use of the T–V distinction in second-person address.  The second-person nominative pronoun is tu for informal use, and for formal use, the third-person form Lei has been used since the Renaissance. It is used like "Sie" in German, "usted" in Spanish, and "vous" in French. Lei was originally an object form of ella, which in turn referred to an honorific of the feminine gender such as la magnificenza tua/vostra ("Your Magnificence") or Vossignoria ("Your Lordship"), and by analogy, Loro came to be used as the formal plural. Previously, and in some Italian regions today (e.g. Campania), voi was used as the formal singular, like French "vous". The pronouns lei (third-person singular), Lei (formal second-person singular), loro (third-person plural), and Loro (formal second-person plural) are pronounced the same but written as shown, and formal Lei and Loro take third-person conjugations. Formal Lei is invariable for gender (always feminine), but adjectives that modify it are not: one would say to a man La conosco ("I know you") but Lei è alto ("You are tall").  Formal Loro is variable for gender: Li conosco ("I know you [masc. pl.]") vs. Le conosco ("I know you [fem. pl.]"), etc. The formal plural is very rarely used in modern Italian; the unmarked form is widely used instead. For example: Gino, Lei è un bravo ingegnere. Marco, Lei è un bravo architetto. Insieme, voi sarete una gran bella squadra. ("Gino, you are a good engineer. Marco, you are a good architect. Together, you will make a very good team.").

Verbs

Based on the ending of their infiniti presenti (-are, -ere, or -ire), all Italian verbs can be assigned to three distinct conjugation patterns. Exceptions are found: fare "to do/make" (from Latin FACĔRE) and dire "to say" (from Latin DICĔRE) were originally 2nd conjugation verbs that reduced the unstressed vowel in the infinitive (and consequentially in the future and conditional, whose stem derives from the infinitive), but still follow the 2nd conjugation for all the other tenses; this behaviour is similarly featured in the verbs ending in -trarre, -porre and -durre, derived respectively from the Latin TRAHĔRE (to drag), PONĔRE (to put) and DVCĔRE (to lead).

Just like many other Romance languages, Italian verbs express distinct verbal aspects by means of analytic structures such as periphrases, rather than synthetic ones; the only aspectual distinction between two synthetic forms is the one between the imperfetto (habitual past tense) and the passato remoto (perfective past tense), although the latter is usually replaced in spoken language by the passato prossimo.

Tenses

Simple tenses

Compound tenses

Aspects other than the habitual and the imperfective, such as the perfective, the progressive and the prospective, are rendered in Italian by a series of periphrastic structures that may or may not be perceived as different tenses by different speakers. Note the difference between:
Perfect aspect: io ho fatto (English: I have done)
Progressive aspect: io sto facendo (English: I'm doing)
Prospective aspect: io sto per fare (English: I'm about to do)

Impersonal forms

Notes

Compound tense auxiliary verbs
In Italian, compound tenses expressing perfect aspect are formed with either auxiliary verb avere ("to have") for transitive verbs and some intransitive verbs and with essere ("to be") for the remaining intransitive verbs, plus the past participle. Progressive aspect is rendered by verb stare plus the gerund. The prospective aspect is formed with stare plus the preposition per and the infinitive.

The passive voice of transitive verbs is formed with essere in the perfective and prospective aspects, with venire in the progressive or habitual aspect, and with either essere or venire in the perfective aspects:
 Il cancello è stato appena aperto. ("The gate has just been opened.")
 Il cancello sta per essere aperto ("The gate is about to be opened")
 Il cancello sta venendo aperto in questo momento. ("The gate is being opened right now.")
 Il cancello viene aperto ogni giorno. ("The gate is opened every day.")
 Il cancello fu/venne aperto in fretta. ("The gate was quickly opened.")

For the perfect tenses of intransitive verbs a reliable rule cannot be given, although a useful rule of thumb is that if a verb's past participle can take on adjectival value, essere is used, otherwise avere. Also, reflexive verbs and unaccusative verbs use essere (typically non-agentive verbs of motion and change of state, i.e. involuntary actions like cadere ("to fall") or morire ("to die")). 

The distinction between the two auxiliary verbs is important for the correct formation of the compound tenses and is essential to the agreement of the past participle. Some verbs, like vivere ("to live"), may use both: Io ho vissuto ("I have lived") can alternatively be expressed as, Io sono vissuto.

Past participle
The past participle is used in Italian as both an adjective and to form many of the compound tenses of the language. There are regular endings for the past participle, based on the conjugation class (see below). There are, however, many irregular forms as not all verbs follow the pattern, particularly the -ere verbs. Some of the more common irregular past participles include: essere (to be) → stato (same for stare); fare (to do, to make) → fatto; dire (to say, to tell) → detto; aprire (to open) → aperto; chiedere (to ask) → chiesto; chiudere (to close) → chiuso; leggere (to read) → letto; mettere (to put) → messo; perdere (to lose) → perso; prendere (to take, to get) → preso; rispondere (to answer) → risposto; scrivere (to write) → scritto; vedere (to see) → visto.

For the intransitive verbs taking essere, the past participle always agrees with the subject—that is, it follows the usual adjective agreement rules: egli è partito; ella è partita.  This is also true for reflexive verbs, the impersonal si construction (which requires any adjectives that refer to it to be in the masculine plural: Si è sempre stanchi alla fine della giornata – One is always tired at the end of the day), and the passive voice, which also use essere (Queste mele sono state comprate da loro – These apples have been bought by them, against Essi hanno comprato queste mele – They bought these apples).

The past participle when used with avere never changes to agree with the subject. It must agree with the object, though, in sentences where this is expressed by a third person clitic pronoun (e.g. Hai mangiato la mela? – Sì, l'ho mangiata (Have you eaten the apple? – Yes, I have eaten it)). When the object is expressed by a first or second person clitic pronoun instead, the agreement is optional: Maria! Ti ha chiamato / chiamata Giovanni? – No, non mi ha chiamato / chiamata (Maria! Has Giovanni called you? – No, he has not).

In all the other cases where the object is not expressed by a clitic pronoun, the agreement with the object is obsolescent in modern Italian (but still correct): La storia che avete raccontata (obsolete) / raccontato non mi convince (The story you told does not convince me); or compare Manzoni's Lucia aveva avute due buone ragioni with the more modern Lucia aveva avuto due buone ragioni (Lucia had had two good reasons).

Tense relationship in subordinate sentences

Italian inherits consecutio temporum, a grammar rule from Latin that governs the relationship between the tenses in principal and subordinate clauses. Consecutio temporum has very rigid rules. These rules require the subjunctive tense in order to express contemporaneity, posteriority and anteriority in relation with the principal clause.

 To express contemporaneity when the principal clause is in a simple tense (future, present, or simple past,) the subordinate clause uses the present subjunctive, to express contemporaneity in the present.
 Penso che Davide sia intelligente. I think David is smart.
 When the principal clause has a past imperfect or perfect, the subordinate clause uses the imperfect subjunctive, expressing contemporaneity in the past.
 Pensavo che Davide fosse intelligente.  I thought David was smart.
 To express anteriority when the principal clause is in a simple tense (future, or present or passato prossimo) the subordinate clause uses the past subjunctive.
 Penso che Davide sia stato intelligente.  I think David has been smart.
 To express anteriority when the principal clause has a past imperfect or perfect, the subjunctive has to be pluperfect.
 Pensavo che Davide fosse stato intelligente. I thought David had been smart.
 To express posteriority the subordinate clause uses the future tense in the indicative mood, not the subjunctive, because the subjunctive has no future tense.
 Penso che Davide sarà intelligente. I think David will be smart.
 To express posteriority with respect to a past event, the subordinate clause uses the past conditional, whereas in other European languages (such as French, English, and Spanish) the present conditional is used.
 Pensavo che Davide sarebbe stato intelligente. I thought that David would have been smart.

Regular conjugation
The infinitive of first conjugation verbs ends in -are, that of second conjugation verbs in -ere, and that of third conjugation verbs in -ire. In the following examples for different moods, the first conjugation verb is parlare (meaning to talk/speak), the second conjugation verb is temere (to fear) and the third conjugation verb is partire (to leave/depart.)

Indicative mood

Many third conjugation verbs insert an infix -sc- between the stem and the endings in the first, second, and third persons singular and third person plural of the present indicative and subjunctive, e.g., capire > capisco, capisci, capisce, capiamo, capite, capiscono (indicative) and capisca, capisca, capisca, capiamo, capiate, capiscano (subjunctive). This subgroup of third conjugation verbs is usually referred to as incoativi, because in Latin the original function of the suffix -sc- was to denote inchoative verbs, but this meaning is totally lost in modern Italian, where the suffix mostly serves a euphonic function.

Subjunctive mood

The Italian subjunctive mood is used to indicate cases of desire, express doubt, make impersonal emotional statements, and to talk about impeding events.

Third conjugation verbs like capire mentioned above insert -isc- in the first, second, and third persons singular and third person plural of the present.
Compound forms (past and past perfect) are made by adding the past participle (e.g. parlato) to the corresponding auxiliary form (as "abbia") in the present and imperfect.

Conditional mood

As the table shows, verbs each take their own root from their class of verb: -are becomes -er-, -ere becomes -er-, and -ire becomes -ir-, the same roots as used in the future indicative tense. All verbs add the same ending to this root.

Some verbs do not follow this pattern, but take irregular roots, these include:
Andare (to go) ~ Andr-, Avere (to have) ~ Avr-, Bere (to drink) ~ Berr-,
Dare (to give) ~ Dar-, Dovere (to have to) ~ Dovr-, Essere (to be) ~ Sar-,
Fare (to make/do) ~ Far-, Godere (to enjoy) ~ Godr-, Potere (to be able to) ~ Potr-,
Rimanere (to remain) ~ Rimarr-, Sapere (to know) ~ Sapr-, Sedere (to sit) ~ Sedr-,
Stare (to be/feel) ~ Star-, Tenere (to hold) ~ Terr-, Vedere (to see) ~ Vedr-,
Venire (to come) ~ Verr-, Vivere (to live) ~ Vivr-, Volere (to want) ~ Vorr- etc.

The Italian conditional mood is a mood that refers to an action that is possible or likely, but is dependent upon a condition. Example:

It can be used in two tenses, the present, by conjugation of the appropriate verb, or the past, using the auxiliary conjugated in the conditional, with the past participle of the appropriate noun:

Many Italian speakers often use the imperfect instead of the conditional and subjunctive. Prescriptivists usually view this as incorrect, but it is frequent in colloquial speech and tolerated in all but high registers and in most writing:

The conditional can also be used in Italian to express "could", with the conjugated forms of potere ("to be able to"), "should", with the conjugated forms of dovere ("to have to"), or "would like", with the conjugated forms of "volere" (want):

Imperative mood

Verbs like capire insert -isc- in all except the noi and voi forms. Technically, the only real imperative forms are the second-person singular and plural, with the other persons being borrowed from the present subjunctive.

Non-finite forms

 Infinitive: present: -are, -ere, -ire; past: avere/essere + past participle
 Gerund: present: -ando, -endo, -endo; past: avendo/essendo + past participle
 Participle': present: -ante -ente -ente; past: -ato, -uto (though verbs of the second conjugation almost always have a contracted desinence, e.g. "cuocere" (to cook) "cotto" (cooked)), -ito

Irregular verbs
While the majority of Italian verbs are regular, many of the most commonly used are irregular. In particular, the auxiliary verbs essere, stare and avere, and the common modal verbs dovere (expressing necessity or obligation), potere (expressing permission and to a lesser degree ability), sapere (expressing ability) and volere (expressing willingness) are all irregular.

The only irregular verbs of the first conjugation are dare (to give), which follows the same pattern as stare, and andare (to go), which features suppletive forms in the present of the indicative, subjunctive and imperative from the Latin verb VADERE. While apparently a 1st conjugation verb, fare is actually a highly irregular verb of the second conjugation. Even the third conjugation features a small handful of irregular verbs, like morire (to die), whose present is muoio, muori, muore, moriamo, morite, muoiono (indicative) and muoia, muoia, muoia, moriamo, moriate, muoiano (subjunctive).

The second conjugation combines the second and third conjugation of Latin; since the verbs belonging to the third conjugation were athematic, and they behaved less regularly than the ones belonging to the other conjugations (compare AMĀRE > AMAVI, AMATVS, first conjugation, and LEGĚRE > LEGI, LECTVS, third conjugation), the second conjugation Italian features many irregularities that trace back to the original paradigms of the Latin verbs: amare > amai, amato (first conjugation, regular), but leggere > lessi, letto (second conjugation, irregular).

Adverbs
An adjective can be made into a modal adverb by adding -mente (from Latin "mente", ablative of "mens" (mind), feminine noun) to the ending of the feminine singular form of the adjective. E.g. lenta "slow (feminine)" becomes lentamente "slowly". Adjectives ending in -re or -le lose their e before adding -mente (facile "easy" becomes facilmente "easily", particolare "particular" becomes particolarmente "particularly").

These adverbs can also be derived from the absolute superlative form of adjectives, e.g. lentissimamente ("very slowly"), facilissimamente ("very easily").

There is also a plethora of temporal, local, modal and interrogative adverbs, mostly derived from Latin, e.g. quando ("when"), dove ("where"), come ("how"), perché ("why"/"because"), mai ("never"), sempre ("always"), etc.

Prepositions
Italian has a closed class of basic prepositions, to which a number of adverbs can be added that also double as prepositions, e.g.: sopra il tavolo ("upon the table"), prima di adesso ("before now").

In modern Italian the prepositions tra and fra are interchangeable, and often chosen on the basis of euphony: tra fratelli ("among brothers") vs. fra i tralicci ("between the power pylons").

In modern Italian, all the basic prepositions except tra, fra, con and per have to be combined with an article placed next to them. Of these, con and per have optional combining forms: col, collo, colla, coll', coi, cogli, colle; pel, pello, pella, pell', pei, pegli, pelle; except for col and coi, which are occasionally used, however, these are archaic and very rare.

Prepositions normally require the article before the following noun in a similar way as the English language does. However Latin's lack of articles influenced several cases of prepositions used without article in Italian (e.g., "a capo", "da capo", "di colpo", "in bicicletta", "per strada").

The preposition su becomes su di before a pronoun (e.g., "su di te"). Some speakers also use su di before a word beginning in u for euphonic reasons (e.g., "su di un cavallo"), but this is regarded as incorrect by grammarians. Historically the variant form sur was used before the letter u; however, this form fell into disuse during the nineteenth century.

Syntax
Italian is an SVO language. Nevertheless, the SVO sequence is sometimes replaced by one of the other arrangements (SOV, VSO, OVS, etc.), especially for reasons of emphasis and, in literature, for reasons of style and metre: Italian has relatively free word order.

The subject is usually omitted when it is a pronoun – distinctive verb conjugations make it redundant.  Subject pronouns are considered emphatic when used at all.

Questions are formed by a rising intonation at the end of the sentence (in written form, a question mark). There is usually no other special marker, although wh-movement does usually occur. In general, intonation and context are important to recognize questions from affirmative statements.

In general, adjectives come after the noun they modify, adverbs after the verb.  But: as with French, adjectives coming before the noun indicate essential quality of the noun.  Demonstratives (e.g. questo this, quello that) come before the noun, and a few particular adjectives (e.g. bello) may be inflected like demonstratives and placed before the noun.

Disputed points in Italian grammar
Among sometimes proscribed Italian forms are:
 The usage of an indicative form where a subjunctive one is traditional; for instance: credo che Giorgio ieri fosse a casa ("I believe that yesterday George was at home") is considered proper, while credo che Giorgio ieri era a casa may not be; se Maria fosse stata a casa, le avrei telefonato ("if Mary had been at home, I would have telephoned her") is preferred, se Maria era a casa le telefonavo is often proscribed, despite being found in classic Italian writers.
 The use of the object forms (lui, lei, loro and Lei) of third person pronouns instead of the subject forms (egli, ella, essi and Ella), which are employed in formal language.
 Ma però, despite being widespread in spoken language, is proscribed in formal usage because it is redundant (ma and però are synonyms).

Italian grammar books
The first Italian grammar was printed by Giovanni Francesco Fortunio in 1516 with the title Regole grammaticali della volgar lingua. Ever since, several Italian and foreign scholars have published works devoted to its description. Among others may be mentioned the famous Grammatica storica della lingua italiana e dei suoi dialetti written by the philologist Gerhard Rohlfs, published at the end of the 1960s.

Among the most modern publications are those by Luca Serianni, in collaboration with Alberto Castelvecchi, Grammatica italiana. Suoni, forme, costrutti (Utet, Torino, 1998); and by Lorenzo Renzi, Giampaolo Salvi and Anna Cardinaletti, Grande grammatica italiana di consultazione (3 vol., Bologna, Il Mulino, 1988–1995). The most complete and accurate grammar in English is A Reference Grammar of Modern Italian'' by Martin Maiden and Cecilia Robustelli (McGraw-Hill, Chicago, 2000; 2nd edition Routledge, New York, 2013).

Bibliography

References

External links

Verb Conjugation Trainer from Molto Bene Italian
Accademia della Crusca